State Highway 22 (SH-22) in Tamil Nadu, India connects Kallanai(Grant Anaicut) with Poompuhar. Total length of SH-22 is 98 km.

SH-22 Route: Kallanai - Thirukattupalli - Thuruvaiyaru - Swamimalai - Kumbakonam - Veppathur - Kadirmangalam - Vanathirajapuram - Mayiladuthurai - Poompuhar

External links
 Kallanai-Poompuhar State Highway Map

State highways in Tamil Nadu